Heus Manufacturing Company, Inc. was a contract machinging business based in New Holstein, Wisconsin. It started in 1898.

In its early years it produced the "Snow Flier", a Model A Ford attached to tank tracks and skis on the front. In essence, it became one of the first snowmobile.

The company was sold to EHR Enterprises in 2007. EHR failed to make payments and the company went out of business. The land on which the company was once located has since been purchased by the City of New Holstein.

References

Manufacturing companies established in 1898
1898 establishments in Wisconsin
Manufacturing companies disestablished in 2007
2007 disestablishments in Wisconsin